Buddleja hieronymi is a species endemic to southern Bolivia and northern Argentina first described and named by Fries in 1905.

Description
Buddleja hieronymi is a dioecious shrub 1 – 1.5 m high with greyish rimose bark. The old naked branches often persist, while the youngest branches are tomentulose, bearing small oblong  subsessile leaves 0.5 – 3 cm long by 0.4 – 1 cm wide, membranaceous or subcoriaceous, tomentulose to glabrescent above, and tomentose below. The yellowish-white inflorescence comprises one globose head 0.5 – 0.7 cm in diameter formed by 6 – 9 flowers, with occasionally a pair of smaller heads below. The tubular corolla is 2.5 – 3 mm long.

Cultivation
The shrub is not known to be in cultivation.

References

hieronymi
Flora of Argentina
Flora of Bolivia
Flora of South America
Dioecious plants